Area E was one of the eight district electoral areas (DEA) which existed in Belfast, Northern Ireland from 1973 to 1985. Located in the north-west of the city, the district elected six members to Belfast City Council and contained the wards of Ardoyne; Ballygomartin; Ballysillan; Highfield; Legoniel; and Woodvale. The DEA formed part of the Belfast North and Belfast West constituencies.

History
The area was created for the 1973 local government elections, combining most of the former Shankill ward and parts of the former Woodvale and Clifton wards with parts of the former Antrim Rural District. It was abolished for the 1985 local government elections. The Ardoyne, Ballysillan and Legoniel wards became part of a new Oldpark DEA, while the remaining wards formed part of the new Court DEA.

Results

1973

1977

1981

References

Former District Electoral Areas of Belfast
1973 establishments in Northern Ireland
1985 disestablishments in Northern Ireland